Levi J. T. Aumua (born 9 October 1994) is a New Zealand rugby union player who plays for  in the Bunnings NPC and Moana Pasifika in Super Rugby. His position of choice is centre.

Career 
He was part of the  squad in 2018 but did not play before being named in the  squad for the 2019 Super Rugby season where he played 4 games. Aumua returned to Tasman for the 2021 Bunnings NPC after time playing in Japan. He signed with Moana Pasifika for the 2022 Super Rugby Pacific season.

Background 
Aumua is of Samoan and Fijian heritage.

References

External links 
 

New Zealand rugby union players
1994 births
Living people
Union Bordeaux Bègles players
Brisbane City (rugby union) players
Tasman rugby union players
Blues (Super Rugby) players
Toyota Industries Shuttles Aichi players
Moana Pasifika players
Hino Red Dolphins players
Chiefs (rugby union) players
Rugby union centres
Rugby union players from Auckland